Finsterwalde is a town in the Elbe-Elster district (German: Landkreis), in Lower Lusatia, Brandenburg, Germany.

Overview
It is situated on the Schackebach, a tributary of the Kleine Elster, 28 m. W.S.W of Cottbus by rail. Pop. (2005) 18,840. The town has a Gothic church (1581), a castle, schools, cloth and cigar factories, iron-foundries, flour and saw mills and factories for machine building. Popular are the "four singers from Finsterwalde" and their "singer-song".

History
Finsterwalde, which is first mentioned in 1288, came into the possession of the Electorate of Saxony from 1635 and of the Kingdom of Prussia in 1815. From 1815 to 1947, Finsterwalde was part of the Prussian Province of Brandenburg. From 1952 to 1990, it was part of the Bezirk Cottbus of East Germany.

Demography

Known persons 

The following well known persons are from Finsterwalde:

 Hansgeorg Bätcher (1914-2003), Oberstleutnant in the Luftwaffe  
 Inge Deutschkron, (1922-2022), German-Israeli journalist and author
 Thomas Eisfeld, (born 1993), football player for Arsenal FC
 Catrin G Grosse (born 1964), artist and painter
 Kurt Haehling (1893-1983), Generalmajor in the Wehrmacht
 Detlef Irrgang, (born 1966), football player
 Sonja Kesselschläger, Heptathlon athlete 
 Hermann Kotzschmar, (1829-1908), German-American musician, conductor and composer
 Peggy Kuznik, Football player
 Otto Ostrowski, (1883-1963), Mayor of Finsterwalde in the 1920s
 Stephanie Pohl, (born 1978), beach volleyball player
 Hans-Jürgen Riediger, football player

Buildings and Monuments
 Finsterwalde Solar Park
 Janusz-Korczak-Gymnasium, formerly Knabenschule by Max Taut (1913)
 In Finsterwalde is located a relief dedicated to Lenin in the park "Bürgerheide"

References

External links

Localities in Elbe-Elster